Sinobioway Group Co., Ltd. was one of the university-owned enterprises of Peking University (the other were Founder Group, Jade Bird Software and Peking University Science Park). The company currently majority (60%) owned by a Peking University professor and other employee of Peking University. The pinyin of the Chinese short name was Wèimíng Jítuán, literally Anonymous Group (or Unnamed Group). However, Sinobioway was not related to other Weiming Group, such as Weiming (Fujian) Investment Group.

Sinobioway Group was incorporated on 19 October 1992. The group now involved in pharmaceutical, agriculture, environment management and other industries.

Equity investments
Sinobioway Group is the largest shareholder of Sinobioway Medicine for 26.38% (as at 30 June 2016). Sinobioway Medicine was involved in the delisting of Sinovac Biotech. Sinobioway Medicine, full name "Shandong Sinobioway Medicine Co., Ltd." (formerly known as Wanchang Science & Technology), acquired "Sinobioway Medicine Co., Ltd." as part of a backdoor listing in 2015.

Sinobioway Group also owned 60% stake of an intermediate holding company which was the largest shareholder of PKU Hi-tech (now known as CAU Technology) for 37.94% shares. In 2005 the stake in the intermediate company were under auction by court ruling, in order to refurbish the debt of Sinobioway Group. It was acquired by a subsidiary of China Agricultural University.

Subsidiaries

 Sinobioway Agriculture (92%)
 Hunan PKU Sinobioway Bio-tech (53.57%)
 Anhui Sinobioway Bio-economy Group (74%)

Shareholders
Sinobioway Group is 60% owned by an intermediate holding company Hainan Tiandao Investment that was owned 83.38% by Pan Aihua, a Peking University professor and chairman of the group; Yang Xiaomin, the president for 8.80% stake, Luo Deshun, the vice-president (and former staff of PKU in student affairs) for 3.94% stake and Zhao Furong, the vice-president (and former auditor of PKU) for 3.88% stake. Another vice-president of the group, Wang Jun, did not own any stake in the company. However, according to the National Enterprise Credit Information Publicity System, the stake of Sinobioway Group were pledged in full or in part several times by the intermediate holding and Zhao Furong, in October 2012 (by Zhao personally), December 2014, June 2015, November 2015 and December 2016, to Chengdu Haizhen Investment (twice), Guoyuan Trust, Shenzhen Central Yunnan Commercial Factoring and 1314 Fund.

The second largest shareholder of Sinobioway Group was the Peking University for 40% stake.

In the past Zhao Furong owned 30% personally as the joint-second largest shareholder of Sinobioway Group (behind the Peking University which owned 40%) in 2005.

References

External links
  
 Sinobioway Agriculture 
 Hunan PKU Sinobioway Bio-tech 
 Anhui Sinobioway Bio-economy Group 

Conglomerate companies of China
Peking University
Government-owned companies of China
Chinese companies established in 1992
Privately held companies of China
Biotechnology companies of China
Companies based in Beijing
Chinese brands